The Zambia International is an international badminton tournament held in Lusaka, Zambia. The event is part of the Badminton World Federation's International Series and part of the Badminton Confederation of Africa's circuit.

Past winners

Performances by nation

References

External links
https://bwf.tournamentsoftware.com/sport/tournament?id=49D7A071-E65A-42BE-B614-9C6A0FB25CE1

Badminton in Zambia
2014 establishments